The 2002 IIHF World U18 Championships were held in Piešťany and Trnava, Slovakia. The championships began on April 11, 2002, and finished on April 21, 2002. Games were played at Zimny Stadion in Piešťany and Zimny Stadion in Trnava. The US team finished first in the final round to capture the gold, while Russia and the Czech Republic captured the silver and bronze medal respectively. USA and Russia played the last game of the final round to determine the medals. Needing to beat Russia by two goals, USA led 2–1 with a minute remaining. They pulled their goalie, leading to Zach Parise's gold medal-winning goal with thirty seconds remaining.

Championship results

Preliminary round

Group A

Results

Group B

Results

Relegation Round

Note: The following matches from the preliminary round carry forward to the relegation round:
April 11, 2004:  2–2 
April 11, 2004:  0–10 
April 12, 2004:  3–2 
April 14, 2004:  3–8 
April 15, 2004:  3–4 
April 17, 2004:  1–4 

Results

Final round

Note: The following matches from the preliminary round carry forward to the final round:
April 11, 2004:  0–9 
April 11, 2004:  4–8 
April 12, 2004:  4–3 
April 14, 2004:  2–3 
April 15, 2004:  4–1 
April 17, 2004:  5–3 

Results

Final standings

Division I
The Division I tournament was played in Celje and Maribor, Slovenia, from 23 to 29 March 2002. With the temporary expansion of the top level to twelve teams because of the late inclusion of Canada, Division I was left short one team.  France, the previous year's runner up in Division II was invited, but failed to respond, so the tournament was played with only seven teams.

First round

Consolation round (Places 5–7)

Play-off 
Semifinal

Third-place play-off

Final

 were promoted to the top level, and no team was relegated for the 2003 IIHF World U18 Championships.

Division II
The Division II tournament was played in Briançon, France, from 22 to 29 March 2002. With North Korea's absence, Romania (the previous year's Division III runners-up) gained a late promotion into this tournament.

First round

Final round and Consolation round

Division III
The Division III tournament was played in Elektrėnai and Kaunas, Lithuania, from 5 to 9 March 2002.

First round 

With the forthcoming reorganization into twelve team divisions, everyone but  were promoted to Division II, and no team was relegated for the 2003 IIHF World U18 Championships.

Play-off round 
7th-place play-off

5th-place play-off

3rd-place play-off

Final

See also
2002 World Junior Championships

References

External links
Official Championship results and statistics

IIHF World U18 Championships
IIHF World U18 Championships
International ice hockey competitions hosted by Slovakia
2001–02 in Slovak ice hockey
April 2002 sports events in Europe